Viktor Nastashevskyi is a former Soviet forward.

References

External links
 

1957 births
Living people
Sportspeople from Karaganda
Soviet footballers
Ukrainian footballers
Ukrainian Premier League players
FC Dnipro players
FC Elektrometalurh-NZF Nikopol players
FC Karpaty Lviv players
FC Mariupol players
FC Metalurh Zaporizhzhia players
FC Torpedo Zaporizhzhia players
FC Kryvbas Kryvyi Rih players
FC Oleksandriya players
Association football midfielders